Lebanese Colombians are Colombians of Lebanese descent. Most of the Lebanese community's forebears immigrated to Colombia from the Ottoman Empire in the late 19th and early 20th centuries for economic, political and religious reasons. The first Lebanese moved to Colombia in the late nineteenth century. There was another wave in the early twentieth century. It is estimated that over 10,000 Lebanese immigrated to Colombia from 1900 to 1930.

Many Lebanese settled in the Caribbean region of Colombia, particularly in the cities of Cartagena, Santa Marta, Lorica, San Andrés (island), Fundación, Aracataca, Ayapel, Calamar, Ciénaga, Cereté, Montería and Barranquilla, near the basin of the Magdalena River. The Lebanese subsequently expanded to other cities and by 1945 there were Lebanese living in Ocaña, Cúcuta, Barrancabermeja, Ibagué, Girardot, Honda, Tunja, Villavicencio, Pereira, Soatá, Neiva, Cali, Buga, Chaparral and Chinácota. The six major hubs of Lebanese population were present in Barranquilla, Cartagena, Bucaramanga, Bogotá and Cali. The number of immigrants entering the country vary from 5,000 to 10,000 in 1945. Some of these immigrants were Christian-Lebanese and others were adept to Islam.

The vast majority of Lebanese Colombians are Catholics, however, in the 1940s, another wave of Lebanese immigrants came to Colombia, settling in the town of Maicao in northern Colombia. These immigrants were mostly Muslims and were attracted by the thriving commerce of the town which was benefiting from the neighboring Venezuelan oil bonanza and the usual contraband of goods that flowed through the Guajira Peninsula.

Notable people
Please see List of Lebanese people in Colombia

See also

Arab diaspora
Lebanese diaspora
Race and ethnicity in Colombia
White Colombians

References

Arab Colombian
Ethnic groups in Colombia
Lebanese diaspora in South America
 
Colombia